The following is a list of programs broadcast by the NFL Network.

Current
America's Game: The Missing Rings
America's Game: The Super Bowl Champions
Around the League (formerly Team Cam)
The Coaches Show
First on the Field (now NFL GameDay First)
A Football Life
Good Morning Football
NFL Classics
NFL Fantasy Live
NFL Films Presents
NFL Follies
NFL GameDay
NFL GameDay Morning
NFL RedZone Replay
NFL Replay
NFL Scoreboard
NFL Top 10
NFL Total Access
NFL Weekly Countdown (formerly Starting 11)
Path to the Draft
Sound FX (formerly Live Wire)
The Timeline
Thursday Night Football
The Top 100: NFL's Greatest Players
Undrafted

Former
Note: some of these programs may still air in reruns.

21st & Primetime
Coachspeak
College Football Now
College Scoreboard
Film Session
Football America
Greatest 4th Quarters
In Their Own Words
Making the Squad
Mic'd Up
NFL AM
NFL Cheerleader Playoffs
NFL Europa
NFL Game of the Week
NFL's Greatest Games (also occasionally on ESPN2)
NFL HQ
NFL Network Now - NFL news
Playbook (TV series)
Pick'em
Point After
Power Rankings
Put Up Your Dukes
Six Days To Sunday
Sounds of the Game
Star Spangled Sundays
Super Bowl Classics
Who Is ...?

Events covered annually
Hall of Fame Game
Inside Minicamp
Inside Training Camp
Live from the Owners Meeting
Live from the Pro Bowl
Live from the Rookie Symposium
Live from the Super Bowl
NFL Draft
NFL Preseason
 NFL Schedule Release
NFL Scouting Combine
Pro Football Hall of Fame Induction Ceremonies

References

External links
Details of all current shows

Programs broadcast by NFL Network